Amita Khopkar is a Marathi stage, film and television actress.

Career 
Khopkar, who is a Marathi veteran actor, has performed in various plays.

Filmography

Television

References

External links

Indian film actresses
Indian stage actresses
Indian television actresses
Living people
Place of birth missing (living people)
1960 births
Actresses in Marathi cinema
Actresses in Marathi theatre